Agononida procera is a species of squat lobster in the family Munididae, and was first described by Shane Ahyong and Gary Poore in 2004. The specific name is derived from procerus, a Latin word meaning "slender", which is in reference to its slender cheliped that distinguish it from the similar Agononida soelae.

References

Squat lobsters
Crustaceans described in 2004
Taxa named by Shane T. Ahyong